The Arboretum du Puy du Fou is an arboretum within the Grand Parc du Puy du Fou, a theme park located on La Papinière, Les Epesses, Vendée, Pays de la Loire, France. It is open daily in the summer; an admission fee is charged.

See also 
 Puy du Fou
 List of botanical gardens in France

References 
 Grand Parc du Puy du Fou

Puy du Fou, Arboretum du
Puy du Fou, Arboretum du